Yalynkuvate is a village in Stryi Raion, Lviv Oblast, of Western Ukraine on the border of the Zakarpattia Oblast.  It belongs to Slavske settlement hromada, one of the hromadas of Ukraine.
The population of the village is 569 persons  and Local government is administered by Volosiankivska village council (village Volosyanka ).

Geography 

History and attractions 
The first information about the Yalynkuvate village dates back from in 1574 year.

The village Yalynkuvate has two architectural monuments of Stryi Raion:
 Church of the Intercession of the Virgin (wooden) 1868 (SN - 1422/1) 
 The bell tower of the church Intercession of the Virgin (wooden) 19th century. (SN - 1422/2) 

Until 18 July 2020, Yalynkuvate belonged to Skole Raion. The raion was abolished in July 2020 as part of the administrative reform of Ukraine, which reduced the number of raions of Lviv Oblast to seven. The area of Skole Raion was merged into Stryi Raion.

References

External links 
 weather.in.ua, Yalynkuvate (Lviv region)
 Ялинкувате, Церква Св. Арх. Михайла 1868 
  Походження назв людських поселень. ВОЛОСЯНКА, ХАЩОВАНЕ І ЯЛИНКУВАТЕ 
 Церква св.Архистратига Михаїла (с.Ялинкувате, Львівська обл.): карта (Церква Покрови Пресвятої Богородиці) 
 Дзвіниця церкви св.Архистратига Михаїла (Дзвіниця церкви Покрови Пресвятої Богородиці)

Literature 
 Горак Р. Ялинкувате / Роман Горак // Радянська Верховина (Сколе). — 1990. 

Villages in Stryi Raion